Large scale or G scale (G gauge) is a track gauge for model railways which is often used for outdoor garden railways because of its size and durability.

G-scale LGB ("Lehmann's Big Train") was introduced in 1968 by Ernst Paul Lehmann Patentwerk in Germany.  LGB products were intended for indoor and outdoor use; so the "G" became interpreted as "garden scale". 

Most track is made of brass which can remain outside in all weather. Track can also be obtained in less expensive aluminium as well as oxidation-resistant, though more expensive, stainless steel.

Like other scales, large scale is sometimes used for model trains that run indoors on a track mounted against the wall near the ceiling.

G scale versus G gauge

G gauge track has a spacing of 45 mm between the railheads (tracks) (c.f. 44.45 mm for 1 gauge , but that does not determine the scale to which the models are built because, to maintain a constant track width when real-life counterparts have a variety of railroad gauges, the scale has to vary. Although often built with standard-sized doors, a narrow-gauge train is in most other respects smaller than its standard-gauge counterpart: its cars are generally narrower and shorter, allowing them to navigate more sharply curved and lightly built tracks.

Model trains are built to represent a real train of standard or narrow gauge.  For example, HO scale (1:87 or 3.5 mm to 1 foot) (and also, although inaccurately, double-O/OO at 4 mm to 1 foot) models all use 16.5 mm gauge track to represent standard gauge trains while a narrower-gauge track such as 9 mm N gauge is used to represent real narrow gauge. 

G model railways depart from this and always use the same gauge with the trains instead built in different sizes depending on whether they are intended to represent standard-gauge or narrow-gauge trains. Because of this it might be more correct to speak of "G gauge" rather than "G scale" since the consistent aspect is the gauge, but the term "G scale" (or "scale IIm") is used when 1:22.5 is used.

The 45 mm gauge originated from 1 gauge or "gauge one" which was first used in Europe and Britain and used to model standard gauge trains in the scale of 1:32.

Scales that run on G gauge track 
 Gauge one: 1:32 (3/8" to the foot). Used to model standard gauge trains of  gauge.
 1:29 scale or A scale: 1:29. First used by Aristo-Craft to model standard-gauge prototypes. Incorrect scale/gauge but proportionally similar to other popular brands of the time.
 G scale: 1:22.5. Used to model European trains that run on  metre gauge track. This scale-gauge combination is called "scale IIm" according to NEM 010. The G comes from the German word groß meaning "big".
 H scale (half inch) 1/2"-to-the-foot, or 1:24 scale. Used to model  gauge or "Cape gauge". Incorrect scale used for 3 ft (914 mm) gauge track.
 F scale (fifteen) 15 mm-to-the-foot scale, (1:20.32). Correct scale/gauge typically used to model North American narrow gauge trains on  gauge track.
 Seven eighths: 7/8"-to-the-foot scale (1:13.7). Used to model trains on  narrow gauge track.
 16 mm scale: 16 mm-to-the-foot (1:19.05). Originally intended for modelling 2-ft gauge prototype railways on 32 mm track (SM32). The models are often re-gauged to also run on 45 mm track. This scale has also been used to model  gauge prototype trains.

Manufacturers
 Accucraft has five scales: Fn3 at 1:20.3, gauge 1 at 1:32, ½-inch scale at 1:24.  They also build 1:29-scale North American models in live steam and electric under the AML brand, as well as British live steam and electric models in 1:19 scale (also called 16 mm) and Isle of Man live steam and electric models in 1:20.3 scale. The Isle of Man scale uses three-foot gauge track, the same width as the dominant U.S. Colorado narrow gauge.
 American Model Builders: 1:24
 Aristo-Craft (REA), which closed in 2013, made two scales: 1:29 and the "Classic" series (generally 1:24 but some models were closer to 1:32 scale).
 Aster (C&S Mogul): 1:32, 1:30 for Japanese prototypes and 1:22.5 for European and Japanese narrow gauge.
 Bachmann's "Big Haulers" series: 1:22.5, while their "Spectrum" series is to 1:20.3 scale and their train streetcars: 1:29
 Buddy "L" (Keystone) (modern): 1:22.5 scale (almost identical to Bachmann, except cab is taller), older (legacy) equipment runs on rails spaced 3-1/4 inches from the pre WWII era.
 Chicago Train Works: 1:32
 Chucks Custom Cars: 1:22.5
 D.A.N.: 1:22.5
 Delton/Caledonia Express: 1:24 (operated from 1983 to 1990 as Delton; until 1993 as Caledonia)
 Eastern Railways: 1:32
 GHB: 1:32
 Great Trains/American Standard: 1:32
 Hartford Products: 1:24 (except SP boxcar and stock car, which are 1:22.5)
 Hartland Locomotive Works products: 1:29 standard-gauge equipment, 1:24 scale narrow-gauge equipment.
 Kalamazoo Toy Train Works: 1:24 (operated from 1980 to the mid-1990s)
 Keystone: 1:22.5
 LGB (sold to Märklin in 2007): 1:22.5
 Lionel: 1:32
 Little Railways: 1:20
 Mainline America: 1:32
 Märklin "Maxi": 1:32
 Model Die Casting: 1:32, except caboose, which is 1:24
 MTH Rail-King: 1:32
 Northern Fine Scale Stock: 10 mm scale. (British-only freight stock in kit form)
 Precision scale: 1:32 standard-gauge, 1:24 narrow gauge
 PIKO: 1:29 (American cars); 1:22.5 (wood-sided passenger cars)
 Roberts Lines (Zephyr): 1:32
 USA Trains: 1:29 ("Ultimate" series); 1:24 ("American" series)
 Wrightway Rolling Stock: 1:32 and 10 mm scale custom-built British North American and European passenger stock.

See also
 Gn15 - 1:22.5-scale models of  gauge trains on  gauge track
 Rail transport modelling (Model railway) scales
 SE scale, ~1:13-scale models

References

External links

 G Scale at DCCWiki - Further information for G scales with links to DCC topics.
 G Scale Central Network
 G-Scale Society
 Garden Trains
 Garden Railways magazine
 History of G gauge & other gauges (N, Z, OO, etc.)
 myLargescale.com G Scale online community
 G Scale News
 The World of LGB
 Garden Chuffers

Model railroad scales
Narrow gauge railway modelling